The Marovaza yellow bat or Marovaza house bat (Scotophilus marovaza) is a species of bat found in Madagascar.

Taxonomy and etymology
It was described as a new species in 2006. The holotype was collected in Marovaza, Madagascar, which inspired its species name.

Description
It is relatively small for its genus.

Biology and ecology
It has been found roosting in the palm-leave thatching of small huts. It roosts singly or in small colonies of up to five individuals. It navigates and locates prey via echolocation; its calls have a frequency of maximum energy of 43.8–48 kHz and a maximum frequency of 58–72.6 kHz. Echolocation pulses last 6–8 seconds. Individuals can be infected with Leptospira.

Range and habitat
The Marovaza house bat is endemic to western Madagascar.

Conservation
As of 2017, it is evaluated as a least-concern species by the IUCN.

References

Mammals of Madagascar
Bats of Africa
Mammals described in 2006
Scotophilus